The Roman Catholic Diocese of San Juan de la Maguana (erected 25 September 1953 as the Territorial Prelature of San Juan de la Maguana, elevated 19 November 1969) is a suffragan diocese of the Archdiocese of Santo Domingo.

Bishops

Ordinaries
 Tomás Francisco Reilly, C.SS.R. (1956–1977)
 Ronald Gerard Connors, C.SS.R. (1977–1991)
 José Dolores Grullón Estrella (1991–2020)
 Tomás Alejo Concepción (2020– )

Coadjutor bishop
Ronald Gerard Connors, C.SS.R. (1976–1977)

Territorial losses

External links and references 
 

San Juan de la Maguana
San Juan de la Maguana
San Juan de la Maguana
San Juan de la Maguana, Roman Catholic Diocese of